Maryam Begum (18th-century) was the daughter of shah Safi of Persia of Persia (r. 1629–1642).

She was the sister of shah Abbas II of Persia of Persia (r. 1642–1666). 

She had great influence over the affairs of state during the reign of Soltan Hoseyn (r. 1694–1722).

References

 

17th-century births
18th-century deaths
18th-century Iranian women
Safavid princesses